Jintao or Jin-tao or variation, may refer to:

 Chen Jintao (1870–1939), founder of the Bank of China (BOC) and Chief Financial Officer of the Republic of China (ROC)
 He Jintao (died 840), general of the Tang dynasty of China 
 Hu Jintao (born 1942), General Secretary of the Chinese Communist Party
 Liao Jintao (born 2000), Chinese soccer player
 Tian Jintao, 21st century Chinese para-ice-hockey player
 Wu Jintao (born 1975), Chinese cross-country skier

See also

 
 Jin (disambiguation)
 Tao (disambiguation)
 Taojin (disambiguation) 
 Tao Jin (disambiguation)